This is a list of Latvians, who have played at least a game in the Kontinental Hockey League.

Players

A (♦) denotes player who has participated in an All Star Game

See also 
List of Latvians in the NHL

References 

Latvians
Latvians in the Kontinental Hockey League
ice hockey